The H-Bomb Girl is a science fiction novel by Stephen Baxter.

Plot introduction
Set in October 1962, in Liverpool, actually in and around the authors own school, with the Cuban Missile Crisis looming, it concerns 14-year-old Laura Mann, who has been entrusted with a strange key and code number to memorize by her father, an RAF officer at Strike Command in High Wycombe. The key turns out to be for a nuclear armed Vulcan bomber and it becomes the target of time travellers from 2007, from alternate versions of Laura's own future, all seeking to change the course of history.

The vibrant popular culture of 1960s Liverpool features prominently in the novel, the climax takes place during a Beatles concert at The Cavern Club with Cilla Black as cloakroom attendant.

Literary significance and reception
The SF Site reviewed the novel favorably, commenting that Baxter's novel was realistic and mostly avoided the clichés associated with stories of time travel, dystopias and the apocalypse.

Adam Roberts praised Baxter's handling of the young adult medium, calling it "a gripping, informative, extremely likeable little novel".

The novel was shortlisted for the 2008 Arthur C. Clarke Award.

References

2007 British novels
2007 science fiction novels
Novels by Stephen Baxter
Faber and Faber books
Novels set in Liverpool
Novels about time travel
Fiction set in 1962
British alternative history novels
British young adult novels
Novels about multiple time paths
Novels about the Cuban Missile Crisis